Bette may refer to:

People and fictional characters
 Bette (given name), a list of people and fictional characters
 Jean-Christophe Bette, French competitive rower
 The noble House of Bette: the Marquess of Lede:
 Guillaum de Bette, 1st Marquess of Lede
 Ambroise de Bette, 2nd Marquess of Lede
 Jean François de Bette, 3rd Marquess of Lede
 Emannuel de Bette, 4th Marquess of Lede
 Françoise de Bette
 Bette people, a Bantu people in Nigeria

Other uses
 Bette (album), by Bette Midler
 Bette (TV series), starring Bette Midler
 Bikku Bitti, formerly Bette Peak, the highest point in Libya

See also
 Bete (disambiguation)
 Bet (disambiguation)